Beartooth Mountain is a  mountain summit located in British Columbia, Canada.

Description

Beartooth Mountain is situated east of Powell Lake in the Coast Mountains, in a remote wilderness area that few visit. Precipitation runoff from Beartooth drains to Powell Lake, thence Strait of Georgia. Topographic relief is significant as the summit rises 1,360 meters (4,462 feet) above Beartooth Creek in two kilometers (1.2 mile).

History

The mountain was named by Buck Bradburn who lived at the mouth of Siwash Creek, across Powell Lake. The landform's toponym was officially adopted April 6, 1950, by the Geographical Names Board of Canada.

To the local Tla'amin people, the iconic mountain is known as kwɛymamin, and it plays the central part in the Tla'amin Flood creation story of their culture.

Climate

Based on the Köppen climate classification, Beartooth Mountain is located in a marine west coast climate zone of western North America. Most weather fronts originate in the Pacific Ocean, and travel east toward the Coast Mountains where they are forced upward by the range (Orographic lift), causing them to drop their moisture in the form of rain or snowfall. As a result, the Coast Mountains experience high precipitation, especially during the winter months in the form of snowfall. Temperatures can drop below −20 °C with wind chill factors  below −30 °C.

See also
 
 Geography of British Columbia
 Sunshine Coast

References

External links
 Weather forecast: Beartooth Mountain
 Beartooth Mountain (photo and video): Zenseekers.com

Pacific Ranges
One-thousanders of British Columbia
New Westminster Land District
Coast Mountains